McLeod County is a county in the U.S. state of Minnesota. At the 2020 census, the population was 36,771. Its county seat is Glencoe.

McLeod County comprises the Hutchinson, MN Micropolitan Statistical Area and is part of the Minneapolis-St. Paul, MN-WI Combined Statistical Area.

History
For thousands of years the area was inhabited by indigenous peoples. At the time of European contact, it was the territory of the Dakota Sioux. The county was created by the Minnesota Territorial legislature on March 1, 1856. It was named for Martin McLeod, a Canadian-born adventurer who became a fur trader and later was elected a territorial representative (1849–1856) in Minnesota. As a young man, he was part of James Dickson's 1836 expedition to the Red River of the North, a journey recounted in his Diary of Martin McLeod, a manuscript held by the Minnesota Historical Society.

"In 1859 the three Czech families already living in McLeod County were joined by those of Josef Vosmek, Josef Zicha, Antonin Nunvaf, and Jan Vanous, all acquaintances from Caledonia, where they had resided for several years after their arrival from Bohemia. Other settlers followed, taking homesteads close by in the present township of Rich Valley".

The county seat was sited at Glencoe as part of the original act; it had been founded (June 11, 1855) by Martin McLeod, who was a member of the townsite company when the county was founded.

The county was the site of several events during the Dakota War of 1862, including the siege of Hutchinson and the killing of the White family near Brownton. It was also the first place to use the Geier Hitch, a kind of animal husbandry that some characterize as animal abuse.

Geography
The South Fork of the Crow River flows easterly through the upper central part of McLeod County, thence into Wright County. Buffalo Creek also flows eastward through the lower central part of the county, thence into Wright. The county terrain consists of low rolling hills, dotted with lakes and lightly etched by drainages and gullies. The area is mostly devoted to agriculture. The terrain is sloped to the east, with its highest point on the upper west border at 1,096' (334m) ASL. Only savanna and prairie soils exist in McLeod County.

Northeast McLeod County once had significant areas of Maple-Basswood or "Big Woods" forests. https://mn.gov/admin/assets/2012-Investigating-Poorly-Known-Areas-of-Minnesota--An-Archaeological-Survey-of-McLeod-County_tcm36-187391.pdf

Major highways

  US Highway 212
  Minnesota State Highway 7
  Minnesota State Highway 15
  Minnesota State Highway 22
 List of county roads

Adjacent counties

 Wright County - northeast
 Carver County - east
 Sibley County - south
 Renville County - west
 Meeker County - northwest

Lakes

 Baker's Lake
 Bear Lake
 Belle Lake (part)
 Bremers Lake
 Butternut Lake (part)
 Campbell Lake (Acoma Township)
 Campbell Lake (part in Winsted Township, part in Carver County)
 Campbells Lake
 Cedar Lake (part)
 Clear Lake (Acoma Township)
 Clear Lake (Sumter Township)
 Coon Lakes (par)
 Dettman Lake
 Eagle Lake
 Echo Lake
 French Lake
 Grass Lake
 Kings Lake
 Kujas Lake
 Lake Addie
 Lake Allen
 Lake Barber
 Lake Byron (part)
 Lake Clara
 Lake Emily
 Lake Harrington
 Lake Hook
 Lake Marion
 Lake Mary
 Lake Todd
 Lewis Lake
 Little Bear Lake
 Loughman Lake
 Mud Lake (Hale and Rich Valley townships)
 Mud Lake: (Lynn Township)
 O'Mera Lake
 Otter Lake
 Pierce Lake
 Piker Lake
 Popp Lake
 Round Grove Lake (part)
 Ryan Lake
 Shakopee Lake (part)
 Silver Lake
 South Lake
 Stahl Lake
 Sustacek Lake
 Swan Lake
 Tomlinson Lake
 Ward Lake (part)
 Whitney Lake
 Winsted Lake

Demographics

2020 census

Note: the US Census treats Hispanic/Latino as an ethnic category. This table excludes Latinos from the racial categories and assigns them to a separate category. Hispanics/Latinos can be of any race.

2000 census
As of the 2000 census, there were 34,898 people, 13,449 households and 9,427 families in the county. The population density was 71.1/sqmi (27.4/km2). There were 14,087 housing units at an average density of 28.7/sqmi (11.1/km2). The racial makeup of the county was 96.62% White, 0.22% Black or African American, 0.18% Native American, 0.56% Asian, 0.07% Pacific Islander, 1.79% from other races, and 0.58% from two or more races. 3.63% of the population were Hispanic or Latino of any race. 57.5% were of German and 8.5% Norwegian ancestry.

There were 13,449 households, of which 34.90% had children under the age of 18 living with them, 59.20% were married couples living together, 7.30% had a female householder with no husband present, and 29.90% were non-families. 25.00% of all households were made up of individuals, and 10.80% had someone living alone who was 65 years of age or older. The average household size was 2.56 and the average family size was 3.08.

The county population contained 27.70% under the age of 18, 7.80% from 18 to 24, 29.30% from 25 to 44, 21.30% from 45 to 64, and 13.90% who were 65 years of age or older. The median age was 36 years. For every 100 females there were 98.40 males. For every 100 females age 18 and over, there were 96.10 males.

The median household income was $45,953 and the median family income was $55,003. Males had a median income of $35,709 compared with $25,253 for females. The per capita income for the county was $20,137. About 2.80% of families and 4.80% of the population were below the poverty line, including 4.80% of those under age 18 and 8.10% of those age 65 or over.

Communities

Cities

 Biscay
 Brownton
 Glencoe (county seat)
 Hutchinson
 Lester Prairie
 Plato
 Silver Lake
 Stewart
 Winsted

Unincorporated communities

 Fernando
 Heatwole
 Komensky
 Lake Addie
 Sherman
 South Silver Lake
 Sumter

Townships

 Acoma Township
 Bergen Township
 Collins Township
 Glencoe Township
 Hale Township
 Hassan Valley Township
 Helen Township
 Hutchinson Township
 Lynn Township
 Penn Township
 Rich Valley Township
 Round Grove Township
 Sumter Township
 Winsted Township

Politics
McLeod County voters have traditionally been Republican. In only one national election since 1964 has the county selected the Democratic Party candidate (as of 2020).

See also
 National Register of Historic Places listings in McLeod County MN

References

External links
McLeod County government’s website

 
Minnesota counties
1856 establishments in Minnesota Territory
Populated places established in 1856